The 2016 Central American Women's Handball Championship took place in Managua, Nicaragua from 22 to 26 November 2016. It acted as a qualifying tournament for the 2017 Pan American Women's Handball Championship.

Results

Round robin
All times are local (UTC−06:00).

Final standing

References

External links
Championship page on PATHF Official Website

Central American Handball Championship
Central American Women's Handball Championship
International sports competitions hosted by Nicaragua